Thomas or Tom Hurst may refer to:

 Thomas James Hurst (born 1971), American photographer, pastor, and entrepreneur
 Tom Hurst (footballer) (born 1987), English footballer
 Tom Hurst (politician) (born 1966), member of the Missouri House of Representatives